Kamikazen: Last Night in Milan is a 1987 Italian comedy film  written and directed by Gabriele Salvatores and starring  Silvio Orlando, Paolo Rossi, Antonio Catania and  Claudio Bisio.

Plot
Six amateur and desperate comedians are called by their agent, just as amateur and desperate as them, for an event. To get the money back from a gambling loss, the agent invents a story that convinces the comedians to pay for acting. The idea is irresistible: among the public of the lousy nightclub where the show will take place, there will be a person in charge of Drive In, the most famous cabaret television show of the moment, looking for new talents to bring to the TV show business.

Cast  
 Paolo Rossi as  Walter Zappa
 Silvio Orlando as  Nicola Minichino
 Antonio Catania as  Antonio Pesci
 Claudio Bisio as  Vincenzo Amato
  Renato Sarti  as  Achille Carmi
  Bebo Storti as  Gino Venturi
 Gigio Alberti as  Bruno
  David Riondino as  Davide
  Flavio Bonacci as  Mario Corallo
  Laura Ferrari as  Isabella
  Gianni Palladino as  Santino
  Nanni Svampa as  Colombo
 Mara Venier as  Caterina De Lellis
  Maria Luisa Santella as  Vittoria
 Diego Abatantuono as Man at the Races
 Aldo Baglio as  Client at the Restaurant
 Giovanni Storti as Brigadiere
  Raul Cremona as  Mafiaman

See also   
 List of Italian films of 1987

References

External links

1987 comedy films
1987 films
Films directed by Gabriele Salvatores
Italian comedy films
Films set in Milan
1980s Italian-language films
1980s Italian films